In 1506, the 12th year of King Yeonsan, a group of officials – notably Park Won-jong, Seong Hui-ahn, Yoo Soon-jeong and Hong Gyeong-ju plotted against the despotic ruler. They launched a coup on 2 September 1506, deposing the king and replacing him with his half-brother, Grand Prince Jinseong. The king was demoted to prince, and exiled to Ganghwado, where he died a few weeks later.  Consort Jang Nok-su, who was regarded as a 'femme fatale'  who had encouraged Yeonsangun's misrule, was beheaded. Yeonsangun's young sons were also killed.

See also
 Injo coup

References

16th century in Korea
16th-century coups d'état and coup attempts